Murder in the Private Car is a 1934 American pre-Code mystery romance film starring Mary Carlisle, Charles Ruggles and Una Merkel. Directed by Harry Beaumont, the production is based on the play The Rear Car by Edward E. Rose. David Townsend was the film's art director.

Plot
This is the story of Los Angeles switchboard operator Ruth Raymond (Mary Carlisle). She learns from lawyer Alden Murray (Porter Hall) that she is actually the daughter of railroad tycoon Luke Carson (Berton Churchill). She had been kidnapped as a baby by Luke's brother and partner Elwood, and placed with strangers. Once it is found out that she is an heiress, there is an attempt on her life by her bodyguard and chauffeur, which is foiled by Godfrey Scott (Charles Ruggles).

A telegram from her father is intercepted and replaced, telling her to meet him in New York instead of Los Angeles, and that a private train car has been arranged. Ruth, Murray, and her best friend Georgia Latham (Una Merkel) board the train bound for New York. In the private car, the lights go out and an announcement is heard, "Eight hours to live", after which Scott introduces himself to Ruth and her friends as a sleuth who prevents crime. Scott reunites Ruth with her boyfriend John Blake (Russell Hardie), who has stowed away. Then the train is suddenly stopped until the wreck of a circus train on the tracks is cleared.

Murray is murdered and "Five hours to live" is announced. Then an escaped circus gorilla attacks Ruth, Georgia, and Scott before jumping from the train to its death. The next morning, the train stops in the same small town where Luke Carson's train has also stopped. He has been tipped off by a radio message to meet her. Now with no reason to go to Los Angeles, her father joins Ruth's party in the private car.

Then one by one all the windows are blackened and the lights put out, and a voice informs the passengers that the private car is about to be uncoupled from the train and will roll backwards downhill towards another train, the Limited; and a secret panel is opened, showing concealed explosives that will make sure no one survives the crash.

Luke Carson recognizes the sinister voice as that of his brother Elwood, who is in fact the conductor in charge of the private car. Elwood confirms his identity and says Luke once cheated him. Scott finds and kills Elwood, then finds a radio transmitter on the car and uses it to broadcast a warning of the imminent collision and explosion. The Limited's engineers hear the broadcast and reverse their train, but this also risks a collision since a freight train is following it. Fortunately there is a conveniently located railway yard where quick-thinking railwaymen can throw switches to send the Limited, the freight, and the runaway private car onto three separate tracks.

Then they dispatch a locomotive to catch up with the runaway car, warning its engineer about the explosives. Rather than coupling to the car, the engineer pulls close to it so that everyone on board can jump onto the front platform of the steam locomotive. Then he stops the locomotive, just before the runaway car derails on a curve and explodes.  When everyone gets off to look, Scott and Georgia embrace.

Cast

 Charles Ruggles as Godfrey D. Scott
 Una Merkel as Georgia Latham
 Mary Carlisle as Ruth Raymond (aka Ruth Carson)
 Russell Hardie as John Blake
 Porter Hall as Alden Murray
 Willard Robertson as Hanks - Car Conductor
 Berton Churchill as Luke Carson
 Cliff Thompson as Mr. Allen 
 Snowflake as Titus - Car Porter 
 Harry Semels as Evil Eye (scenes deleted)

Uncredited cast

 Ernie Adams as Taxi Driver 
 Hooper Atchley as Conductor on Eastbound Train 
 Jack Baxley as Conductor in Holton 
 Walter Brennan as Switchman 
 Raymond Brown as Bertillion Man 
 James P. Burtis as Switchman 
 Jack Cheatham as Foreman 
 Ray Corrigan as Naba the Gorilla 
 Sterling Holloway as Office Boy 
 Olaf Hytten as Man Asking About Radio 
 Wilfred Lucas as Train Conductor Thrown from Train 
 Matt McHugh as Policeman Stopping John 
 G. Raymond Nye as Detective 
 Lee Phelps as Policeman Carrying Ruth

Production
The entire film was shot along the Southern Pacific's Donner Pass.

References

External links
 
 
 
 

1934 films
1930s mystery films
1930s romance films
American black-and-white films
American films based on plays
American mystery films
American romance films
Comedy mystery films
Films directed by Harry Beaumont
Films set in Los Angeles
Films set on trains
Metro-Goldwyn-Mayer films
Films with screenplays by Edgar Allan Woolf
1930s English-language films
1930s American films